Heighington is a village and civil parish in the North Kesteven district of Lincolnshire, England.

In the 2001 Census the population of the parish was recorded as 2,918 in 1,203 households.

Geography
Heighington civil parish adjoins to the south of Washingborough. To the west of the village, the parish boundary with Washingborough follows Sheepwash Lane and at the bridge at the crossroads over the railway, follows Washingborough Road east. When travelling on the main road between the two villages, Washingborough Pits is the main demarcation. It passes along Gail Grove, a section of Lee Avenue, Sandra Crescent, along the back of the gardens of Eve Gardens to the east, then along a footpath to the north of Sunningdale Grove. It follows the footpath east, then follows a hedge northwards to meet Fen Road (B1190), passing through Moor Farm, to the east of the farm shop, and north of Willow Tree Farm, it follows Middle Fen Lane to the north-east along Heighington Fen. It passes to the north of Slate House Farm along a track, and at Boundary Farm, next to the River Witham and National Cycle Route 1 (Water Rail Way), it becomes the North Kesteven boundary, with West Lindsey and Fiskerton. At Branston Island, on the Witham, it meets Branston, and follows the Branston Delph to the south-west. Just south of Corporation Farm, at Branston Booths, it crosses Bardney Road (B1190) and Car Dyke, then follows Moor Lane, and crosses the railway.  west of the junction with Potterhanworth Road, it follows a hedge-line north, close to the east of Branston and on the eastern edge of Branston Community College playing fields.  north of the school on Branston Road, it meets the parish of Washingborough, at the point where it joins the footpath to Washingborough Top. The parish does not border Canwick.

History
Heighington is not mentioned in Domesday. The chapel may have been a chapel of ease or a field church. It is mentioned in a will of 1524.
A clock was erected to serve as a Great War memorial on the tower of Heighington's Chapel of Ease in 1924.
Heighington Railway station closed in 1964.

Community
Parts of Heighington lie within a conservation area. The 2001 Census recorded 1,203 households. The parish council has 11 members. The village shares a county councillor with Washingborough.

Heighington chapel, a former church, This reference to a former Church is recent. Over several years, including 1922, there has been no reference to it being a church, always the chapel as far back as records go. The chapel had no dedication until 1996 when it was dedicated to St Thomas, and in the group of Washingborough with Heighington, and Canwick. The building is of 12th-century origin, is Grade II listed, and was restored in 1619 as a chapel by Thomas Garratt, a 'fen-adventurer' of the fen drainage scheme. Garratt gave lands for the support of the teaching of grammar and Latin and the reading of divine service within the chapel. This teaching took place until 1864–65, after which a new attached school house was built by Michael Drury, the older structure reserved for Church of England worship. This grammar school was attached to the church until 1885, and later moved to the Thomas Garrett Arts, Crafts and Heritage Centre; it closed in 1976.

In 1885 Kelly’s noted the presence of Wesleyan and Wesleyan Reform chapels; a Grade II listed former Methodist chapel still exists now used as a business premises. 

Heighington's 23 (2019) listed buildings include a manor house, farmhouse, and various houses and cottages with other attached buildings. A notable unlisted building is Heighington Hall, an 18th-century mansion with gardens designed by the noted landscape architect Edward Milner.
 
Village public houses are the Butcher and Beast and the Turks Head, both on High Street.

The village school is Heighington Millfield Primary Academy (formerly Millfield Community Primary School). To the south of the village and east of the railway line is Bracken Hill Golf Club.
The Peterborough to Lincoln Line passes through the west of the village. The Branston and Heighington railway station closed in the 1960s and was on the south-western edge of the village on Station Road. Five Mile House railway station on the Lincolnshire Loop Line, although close to Fiskerton, was also within the parish boundary. That line closed in 1964. The nearest active station is Lincoln.

References

External links

Parish Council
Millfield Community Primary Academy

Villages in Lincolnshire
Civil parishes in Lincolnshire
North Kesteven District